Modern City Montessori Intermediate College (MCMIC) is an Indian school providing education from K.G to 10+2 in Deoria of India. It is being operated in both Hindi and English medium.

History 
Modern City Montessori Intermediate College (MCMIC) was founded in 1988 by a group of teachers under the leadership of Surendra Tiwari (Chairperson), Girish Chandra Tiwari (Chairperson), Adhaya Prasad Tiwari (Principal) and Mithilesh Mishra (Senior Teacher). It was started in a rented building near Permarthi Pokhra at that time. Later on, it shifted to Nehru Nagar, New Colony Deoria to its own building. Initially, the school aimed to serve up to junior high school. In 1997, the school started its high school program which again expended in 2004 by starting Intermediate program. In 2010 the school started its English Medium program up to primary school in a new building which extended in 2011 to the junior high school.

Academics 
The school is co-educational, open to both boys and girls from Kindergarten to Intermediate in Hindi Medium (U.P.Board) and from Kindergarten to junior high in English medium. The school organizes various extracurricular activities such debate, GS/GK competitions, science exhibitions, poem competitions, gaming events, and other cultural events.

Campus 
MCMIC has two buildings, one in Nehru Nagar which operates in Hindi and another in New Colony which operates in English. The school has a hostel with food and lodging for those students who want to live at the school.

Scholarship  
The school has various scholarship programs to support students in need.

See also
Board of High School and Intermediate Education Uttar Pradesh
Deoria, Uttar Pradesh

References

External links
 

Primary schools in Uttar Pradesh
High schools and secondary schools in Uttar Pradesh
Education in Deoria, Uttar Pradesh
Educational institutions established in 1988
1988 establishments in Uttar Pradesh
Intermediate colleges in Uttar Pradesh